ISO 3166-2:VE is the entry for Venezuela in ISO 3166-2, part of the ISO 3166 standard published by the International Organization for Standardization (ISO), which defines codes for the names of the principal subdivisions (e.g., provinces or states) of all countries coded in ISO 3166-1.

Currently for Venezuela, ISO 3166-2 codes are defined for 1 capital district, 1 federal dependency, and 23 states. The Venezuelan Capital District contains the central part of the capital of the country Caracas and has special status equal to the states.

Each code consists of two parts, separated by a hyphen. The second part is a letter:
 A: federal district
 B–V (except Q): states as of late 1980s
 W: federal dependency
 X: state created in 1998
 Y–Z: former federal territories given state status in early 1990s

Current codes
Subdivision names are listed as in the ISO 3166-2 standard published by the ISO 3166 Maintenance Agency (ISO 3166/MA).

Click on the button in the header to sort each column.

Changes
The following changes to the entry have been announced by the ISO 3166/MA since the first publication of ISO 3166-2 in 1998:

See also
 Subdivisions of Venezuela
 FIPS region codes of Venezuela

References

External links
 ISO Online Browsing Platform: VE
 States of Venezuela, Statoids.com

2:VE
ISO 3166-2
Venezuela geography-related lists